1966 in professional wrestling describes the year's events in the world of professional wrestling.

List of notable promotions 
Only one promotion held notable shows in 1966.

Calendar of notable shows

Championship changes

EMLL

NWA

Debuts
Debut date uncertain:
Leo Burke
Tony St. Clair
January 26 André the Giant
September 16  Baron Von Raschke
October 2  Gran Cochisse
December  Bobby Duncum Sr.

Births
January 3  Itzuki Yamazaki
January 4  La Parka II(died in 2020) 
January 12  Tariel Bitsadze
January 13  Rockin' Rebel(died in 2018) 
January 20  Haystacks Calhoun Jr. 
January 28  Tim Patterson
January 30  Jeque
January 31  Giant González(died in 2010) 
February 10 Chris Youngblood(died in 2021) 
March 8  Ursula Hayden (died in 2022) 
March 11  Robby Brookside
March 13  Akira Nogami
March 24  Mitsuhiro Matsunaga
April 4  Ulf Herman
April 6   Tiffany Million
April 18  Todd Pettengill 
April 19  El Samurai
April 23  Bubba the Love Sponge 
May 9  Brazo Cibernético(died in 1999)
May 20  Maniaco
May 22:
Scott Putski
David Penzer
May 26:
Tinieblas Jr.
Misterioso
May 28  Jerrito Estrada
June 21:
Mario Mancini 
Mancow Muller 
June 28  Erik Paulson
July 9:
 Tom Brandi
 Cannonball Grizzly
July 10  Johnny Grunge(died in 2006)  
July 16:
Arkángel de la Muerte(died in 2018)  
Blue Demon Jr.
July 22  Shaun Simpson
August 1  Mike Chioda
August 2  Takashi Iizuka
August 3  Butterbean 
August 4  Kensuke Sasaki
August 7  Asya 
August 8  Miwa Sato 
August 19  Lilian Garcia
August 22  Hardbody Harrison
August 30  Scott Stanford 
September 19  Yoshihiro Takayama
October 2  Yokozuna(died in 2000) 
October 5  Terri Runnels
October 8  Art Barr(died in 1994) 
October 21  Chris Hamrick
October 25  Perry Saturn
October 31  Koji Kanemoto
November 2  Yoshinari Ogawa
November 10  Bill DeMott
November 11  Scorpio Jr.
November 13  Mike Anthony
November 22  Ed Ferrara
November 26  Brian Lee
November 29  John Bradshaw Layfield
December 2  Jinsei Shinzaki
December 8  Tyler Mane
December 12  Último Dragón
December 15  Chocoball Mukai
December 16  Mens Teioh
December 18  Espectrito(died in 2016) 
December 27:
Bill Goldberg
Jerry Tuite(died in 2003)

Deaths
March 17  Don Eagle, 40 
March 30  Sammy Stein, 60
May 17  Randolph Turpin, 37
August 8  Ed Lewis 75
May 25  Chris Zaharias 52
August 1  Jack Spellman, 67
October 16  Sándor Szabó 60
November 10  Ad Santel 79
November 15 - Dimitrios Tofalos, 82

References

 
professional wrestling